Courlans is a commune in the Jura department in Bourgogne-Franche-Comté in eastern France.

Geography
The Vallière flows southwest through the commune's southern part and forms part of its southwestern border.

Population

See also
Communes of the Jura department

References

Communes of Jura (department)